The Coal Region is a region of Northeastern Pennsylvania. It is known for being home to the largest known deposits of anthracite coal in the world with an estimated reserve of seven billion short tons. 

The region is typically defined as comprising five Pennsylvania counties, Carbon County, Lackawanna County, Luzerne County, Northumberland County, and Schuylkill County. It is home to 910,716 people as of the 2010 census. 

The Coal Region is bordered by Berks, Lehigh, and Northampton Counties (including the Lehigh Valley) to its south; Columbia and Dauphin Counties to its west; Wyoming County to its north; and Warren County, New Jersey to its east.

History

The population of the Amerindian tribesmen of the Susquehannock nation was reduced 90 percent in three years of a plague of diseases and possibly war, opening up the Susquehanna Valley and all of Pennsylvania to settlement as the tribe was all but eliminated. Settlement in the region predates the American Revolution. Both Delaware and Susquehannock power had been broken by disease and wars between Native American tribes before the British took over the Dutch and Swedish colonies and settled Pennsylvania. 

The first discovery of anthracite coal in the region occurred in 1762, and the first mine was established in 1775 near Pittston. In 1791, anthracite was discovered by a hunter atop Pisgah Ridge, and by 1792 the Lehigh Coal & Navigation Company began producing and shipping coal to Philadelphia via Mauch Chunk from the Southern Anthracite Field and Summit Hill, built atop the line between Schuylkill County and what would be renamed Carbon County. By 1818, customers fed up with the inconsistent mismanagement leased the Lehigh Coal Mining Company and founded the Lehigh Navigation Company: construction soon began for navigation; the locks and dams on the Lehigh River rapids stretches, later known as the Lehigh Canal (finished in 1820).

In 1822, the two companies merged as the Lehigh Coal & Navigation Company (LC&N), and by 1824 the company was shipping large volumes of coal down the Lehigh and Delaware Canals. Pennsylvania began the Delaware Canal to connect the Lehigh Canal to Philadelphia and environs, while funding to build a canal across the Appalachians' Allegheny Mountains to Pittsburgh. In 1827, LC&N built the second railroad in the country, a gravity railroad from Mauch Chunk Switchback Railway, running Summit Hill to Mauch Chunk.

Population rapidly grew in the period following the American Civil War, with the expansion of the mining and railroad industries. English, Welsh, Irish and German immigrants formed a large portion of this increase, followed by Polish, Slovak, Ruthenian, Ukrainian, Hungarian, Italian, Russian, Jewish, and Lithuanian immigrants. The influence of these immigrant populations is still strongly felt in the region, with various towns possessing pronounced ethnic characters and cuisine.

The anthracite mining industry loomed over the region until its decline in the 1950s. Strip mines and fires, most notably in Centralia, remain visible. Several violent incidences in the history of the U.S. labor movement occurred within the coal region as this was the location of the Lattimer Massacre and the home of the Molly Maguires.

The Knox Mine Disaster in 1959 served as the death knell for deep mining which faded away in the mid 1960s; almost all current anthracite mining is done via strip mining. Tours of underground mines can be taken in Ashland, Scranton, and Lansford, each of them also having museums dedicated to the mining industry. Also evident are patch towns, small villages affiliated with a particular mine. These towns were owned by the mining company. Though no longer company owned, many hamlets survive; one of them, the Eckley Miners' Village, is a museum and preserved historical town owned and administered by the Pennsylvania Historical and Museum Commission, which seeks to restore patch towns to their original state.

Geography

The Coal Region lies north of the Lehigh Valley and Berks County regions, south of the Endless Mountains, west of the Pocono Mountains, and east of the Susquehanna Valley.  The region lies at the northern edge of the Ridge-and-Valley Appalachians, and draws its name from the vast deposits of anthracite coal that can be found under several of the valleys in the region.  The Wyoming Valley is the most densely populated of these valleys, and contains the cities of Wilkes-Barre, Greater Pittston, and Scranton. Hazleton and Pottsville are two of the larger cities in the southern portion of the region. The Lehigh and Schuylkill rivers both originate within the region, while the much larger Susquehanna River skirts the northern edge.

Academics have made the distinction between the North Anthracite Coal Field and the South Anthracite Coal Field, the lower region bearing the further classification Anthracite Uplands in physical geology. The Southern Coal Region can be further broken into the Southeastern and Southwestern Coal Regions, with the divide between the Little Schuylkill River and easternmost tributary of the Schuylkill River with the additional divide line from the Lehigh River watershed extended through Barnesville the determining basins.

People

Notable people from the Coal Region

Nick Adams, actor
Joe Amato, five-time NHRA Top Fuel Champion Drag Racer
Gary Becker, Nobel Prize–winning economist (1992).
David Bohm, quantum physicist
George Bretz (1842-1895), photographed the Coal Region
Les Brown, jazz musician
Bill Bufalino, attorney
Ben Burnley, lead singer of rock band Breaking Benjamin
P. J. Carlesimo, professional basketball coach, San Antonio Spurs
Robert P. Casey, former Governor of Pennsylvania
Bob Casey, Jr., U.S. Senator
George Catlin, artist
Jimmy Cefalo, professional football player, Miami Dolphins
Stan Coveleski, Major League Baseball Hall of Fame member
Anthony P. Damato, United States Marine, Medal of Honor recipient
Jack Dolbin, professional football player, Denver Broncos
Jimmy Dorsey, jazz clarinetist, saxophonist, big band leader
Tommy Dorsey, jazz trombonist, big band leader
Ellen Albertini Dow, actress, The Wedding Singers Rapping Granny
Ham Fisher, cartoonist
Daniel J. Flood, U.S. Congressman
Alexander Joseph Foley, United States Marine, Medal of Honor recipient
Howard Gardner, scientist, author
James M. Gavin, Lieutenant General, United States Army
Jimmy Gownley, author, illustrator, cartoonist
Tim Holden, former U.S. Congressman 
Henry Hynoski, professional football player for the New York Giants
Jane Jacobs, sociologist, author
Russell Johnson, actor
John E. Jones III, judge
George Joulwan,  Supreme Allied Commander, Europe from 1993 to 1997.
Paul E. Kanjorski, member of Congress
Jean Kerr, author
Eddie Korbich, actor
Matthew Lesko, infomercial personality
Edward B. Lewis, Nobel Prize-winning scientist
Joe Maddon, manager of the Chicago Cubs
Joseph L. Mankiewicz, film director, producer, and screenwriter
Richard Marcinko, Navy Seal, author
Christy Mathewson, professional baseball player
Francis T. McAndrew, Psychologist/Professor/Author
Mary McDonnell, actress
Gerry McNamara, college basketball player, Syracuse University
Jason Miller, Pulitzer Prize-winning playwright, actor
Mike Munchak, professional football coach and  former professional football player
Jozef Murgaš, radio pioneer
Amedeo Obici, founder of the Planters Peanuts Company
John O'Hara, author
Jim O'Neill, former baseball player
Steve O'Neill, former baseball player
Jack Palance, actor
William Daniel Phillips, Nobel Prize-winning scientist
Joe Pisarcik, former NFL quarterback
Darryl Ponicsan, author, screenwriter
Robert Reich, former U.S. Secretary of Labor
Paul W. Richards, former astronaut
Conrad Richter, author
Hugh Rodham, father of Hillary Rodham Clinton
Tim Ruddy, former professional football player, Miami Dolphins
Victor Schertzinger, composer, film director, film producer and screenwriter
William Scranton, former Governor of Pennsylvania and 1964 U.S. Presidential candidate
William Scranton, III, former Lieutenant Governor of Pennsylvania
B. F. Skinner, psychologist, radical behaviorist, Harvard professor, and author
Jimmy Spencer, former NASCAR driver and current TV analyst
Bob Sura, former NBA basketball player
Charley Trippi, played for Pittston Patriots, NFL Hall of Fame
John Anthony Walker, spy for the Soviet Union
Ed Walsh, former professional baseball player, Chicago White Sox

See also

Eckley Miners' Village
Franklin B. Gowen
Major coal producing regions
Schuylkill Canal

References

External links

Coal Mine Region - The Carpathian Connection
Pennsylvania's Northern Coal Field
A collection of nostalgia and regionalisms from the Anthracite Coal Region of Pennsylvania
The Anthracite Coal region
Map of the anthracite coal fields of Pennsylvania
History of anthracite coal mining
Abandoned Anthracite Mines in PA
 Brief history of the Molly Maguires
"A Jewel In the Crown of Old King Coal Eckley Miners' Village" by Tony Wesolowsky, Pennsylvania Heritage Magazine, Volume XXII, Number 1 - Winter 1996
 A website with extensive detail on and a virtual tour of Eckley

 01
Coal mining regions in the United States
Mining in Pennsylvania
Regions of Pennsylvania
Carbon County, Pennsylvania
Lackawanna County, Pennsylvania
Luzerne County, Pennsylvania
Northumberland County, Pennsylvania
Schuylkill County, Pennsylvania